Hong Gyeong-seop (born 21 April 1971) is a South Korean field hockey player. He competed in the men's tournament at the 1996 Summer Olympics.

References

External links

1971 births
Living people
South Korean male field hockey players
Olympic field hockey players of South Korea
Field hockey players at the 1996 Summer Olympics
Place of birth missing (living people)
Asian Games medalists in field hockey
Asian Games silver medalists for South Korea
Medalists at the 1998 Asian Games
Field hockey players at the 1998 Asian Games
1998 Men's Hockey World Cup players
20th-century South Korean people
21st-century South Korean people